Indonesian hip hop is hip hop music performed in Indonesia. Hip hop music began to be produced in Indonesia in the early 1990s, with the first Indonesia artist to release a full-length hip hop album being the emcee Iwa K, who has released five albums to date. Other Indonesian hip hop groups and solos include Boyz Got No Brain, Neo, Sweet Martabak, Jogja HipHop Foundation, Saykoji, ZeckoZICK, Zero Nine, Behind Da Board, Borneo Clan, Jie Rapp and Yacko. Many Indonesian hip hop groups rhyme in the Indonesian language, but there are also groups that rhyme in English. Variously, songs often combine formal Indonesian with street slang, youth code, regionally colored pronunciations, and even expressions from regional languages (typically Javanese, Sundanese, or Betawi).

Kamaludeen Mohamed Nasir's book, Representing Islam: Hip-Hop of the September 11 Generation, discusses the contributions of the Jogja Hiphop Foundation (JHF) to the Indonesian hip-hop scene. Founded in 2003, the group infuses Indonesian culture into their music. They believe that traditional Javanese wayang kulit and gamelan music form solid bases for hip-hop to build on. JHF’s musical inspiration comes from a variety of diverse indigenous sources such as gamelan, local folktales, shalawatan, dangdut, and Jathilan. In 2014, in line with other hip-hop superstars like Jay-Z, P Diddy and Kanye West, the JHF also started a clothing apparel called Bom Batik. 

One key feature of Indonesian hip hop that is different compared with American hip hop is that the language used in Indonesian hip hop is more polite and does not use vulgar language, and does not often make references to sex and violence.

Indonesian hip hop music is a youth subculture. It has been seen as a form of protest against the New Order government's state-imposed understanding of the Indonesian cultural identity. It has largely been condemned by key political figures such as former president B.J. Habibie. In January 1995, Habibie raised objections against organising an Indonesian rap festival.
Yudhistira A.N.M. Massardi, reporting for the weekly news magazine Gatra, quoted Habibie as remarking:

"The younger generation shouldn’t want to be enslaved by an aspect of foreign culture [with] which isn’t even liked in its own country. It’s not even appropriate over there, much less in Indonesia. It’s not suitable. . . . I don’t agree with it because it’s of no use whatsoever, especially for the young generation."

Indonesian hip hop is often mixed with heavy metal. This is called hip-metal. Groups such as Iwa-K and Denada have music that is of this style.

Rich Brian gained internet popularity through his single, "Dat Stick" in 2016, with the song peaking at number 4 on the US Bubbling Under R&B/Hip-Hop Singles chart.

References

http://www.hiphopindo.net/news

Relevant Links
Article about Indonesian hip hop music online
Inside Indonesia's Interview with Homicide's front Ucok
Indonesian Hip Hop Online
Blog article featuring graffiti from Surabaya

Website Indonesian Rapper